Otis Leonard "Blackie" Carter (September 30, 1902 – September 10, 1976) was an American professional baseball player. He played briefly in Major League Baseball for the New York Giants during 1925 and 1926, appearing in six games.

Carter attended Furman University, where he was captain of the 1923 Furman Purple Hurricane football team. He had a lengthy minor league career from 1923 to 1940, during which he appeared in over 1700 games. From 1933 to 1940, Carter was minor-league player-manager in the Piedmont League, Bi-State League, South Atlantic League and North Carolina State League. He was also a scout for the Brooklyn Dodgers. After his baseball career, he worked for an industrial belt manufacturing company in Kingsport, Tennessee. Carter died in 1976; he was survived by his wife and three daughters.

References

External links

1902 births
1976 deaths
Major League Baseball outfielders
New York Giants (NL) players
Baseball players from South Carolina
Minor league baseball managers
Furman Paladins baseball players
Furman Paladins football players
Winston-Salem Twins players
Greenville Spinners players
Richmond Colts players
Newark Bears (IL) players
Buffalo Bisons (minor league) players
Toledo Mud Hens players
Reading Keystones players
Nashville Vols players
Norfolk Tars players
Charlotte Hornets (baseball) players
Wilmington Pirates players
Leaksville-Draper-Spray Triplets players
Columbia Sandlappers players
Asheville Tourists players
Columbia Senators players
Salisbury Bees players
Cooleemee Cools players
Landis Dodgers players